Rinderbach may refer to:

Rinderbach (Ruhr), a river of North Rhine-Westphalia, Germany, tributary of the Ruhr
Rinderbach (Brehmbach), a river of Baden-Württemberg, Germany, tributary of the Brehmbach
Rinderbach (Lohr), a river of Bavaria, Germany, tributary of the Lohr
the village Rinderbach that is part of Rüegsau in the Swiss canton of Bern
the hamlet Rinderbach that is part of Affoltern im Emmental in the Swiss canton of Bern
the district Rinderbach that is part of Heimiswil in the Swiss canton of Bern